Nyctimystes semipalmatus, the Kokoda big-eyed tree frog, is a species of frog in the subfamily Pelodryadinae, endemic to Papua New Guinea. Its natural habitats are subtropical or tropical moist lowland forests, rivers, and heavily degraded former forests.

References

semipalmatus
Amphibians of Papua New Guinea
Amphibians described in 1936
Taxonomy articles created by Polbot